Frati may refer to:

People
 Dorina Frati, Italian classical mandolin player
 Luigi Frati (born 1943), Italian academic physician
 Stelio Frati (1919–2010 ), Italian mechanical engineer and aeroplane designer

Other
 Corte de' Frati, town and comune in the Italian province of Cremona
 Monte dei Frati, mountain in the Italian province of Arezzo